William Jackson Humphreys (February 3, 1862 – November 10, 1949) was an American physicist and atmospheric researcher.

Biography
Humphreys was born on February 3, 1862, in Gap Mills, West Virginia to Jackson and Eliza Ann (née Eads) Humphreys.  He studied physics at Washington & Lee University in Virginia and later at Johns Hopkins University in Baltimore, where he earned his Ph.D. in 1897, studying under Henry Augustus Rowland.

He worked in the fields of spectroscopy, atmospheric physics and meteorology. In the field of spectroscopy he found the shift of spectral lines under pressure. In atmospheric physics he found a very good model for the stratosphere in 1909. He wrote numerous books, including a textbook titled Physics of the Air, first published in 1920 and considered a standard work of the time, though it was last published in 1940. He also held some teaching positions at universities. He concluded that the 1815 eruption of Mount Tambora was responsible for the subsequent cooling known as the Year Without a Summer.

From 1905 to 1935 he worked as a physicist for the U.S. Weather Bureau, predecessor of the National Weather Service. In 1919, he served as president of the Philosophical Society of Washington. In 1924 he was an Invited Speaker of the ICM in Toronto.

He died on November 10, 1949, in Washington, D.C.

Bibliography
Physics of the Air (1920)
Weather proverbs and paradoxes (1923)
Fogs and clouds, The Williams & Wilins Co. (1926)
Rain making and Other weather vagaries (1926)
Snow crystals (1931)

References

American physicists
American meteorologists
American people of Welsh descent
1862 births
1949 deaths
Howard N. Potts Medal recipients
Washington and Lee University alumni
Johns Hopkins University alumni